Tanttu is a Finnish surname. Notable people with the surname include:

 August Tanttu (1859–1937), Finnish farmer and politician
 Aatami Tanttu (1887–1939), Finnish wrestler

Finnish-language surnames